Isabelle Oehmichen (born 9 March 1961) is a French classical pianist.

Biography 
Born in Paris, Oehmichen is First Grand Prize winner of the 1989 International Piano Competition Milosz Magin and in 1993 Laureate of the Foundation Georges Cziffra. Isabelle Oehmichen was destined for classical dance, her passion, but after a broken ankle, she really started playing the piano at 17.

After years of hard work, Isabelle Oehmichen plays as a soloist throughout Europe and particularly in Central Europe. Every year she gives numerous recitals, concerts in chamber music or with orchestra. She often participates in radio and television programs (recitals filmed in Żelazowa Wola, the native home of Chopin and Saint-Saëns's 2nd concerto at the Franz Liszt Academy in Budapest live on Bartók Radio).

Isabelle Oehmichen has already recorded several CDs of works by Chopin, Magin, Sauguet, Collet, Liszt, concertos with orchestra by Weiner, Wissmer, Mozart, Dohnanyi.

She is also artistic director of the A.M.F.H. (Association Musicale Franco-Hongroise) in Paris.

Very attached to teaching amateur adults, she created with the Hungarian conductor  an International Summer Academy of Chamber Music in Budapest, open to all. Isabelle Oehmichen also founded the Trio Primavera, Franco-Hungarian trio (piano, violin and cello) which performs regularly in France and Hungary in particular.

From 24 to 26 September 2009, Isabelle Oehmichen recorded at the 4'33" studio in Ivry-sur-Seine a set of nocturnes by Carl Czerny (1791-1857) (Éditions Hortus, 2010).

References

External links 
 Isabelle Oehmichen's personal website
 Isabelle Oehmichen on Piano bleu
 Isabelle Oehmichen on Foundation Sziffra
 Isabelle Oehmichen
 Discography on Discogs
 Czerny, Nocturne Op.368 N°4, Isabelle Oehmichen (YouTube)

21st-century French women classical pianists
1961 births
Living people
Musicians from Paris